Lepidochrysops reichenowii is a butterfly in the family Lycaenidae. It is found in Angola.

References

Butterflies described in 1879
Lepidochrysops
Endemic fauna of Angola
Butterflies of Africa
Taxa named by Hermann Dewitz